The Great Banyan is a banyan tree (Ficus benghalensis) located in Acharya Jagadish Chandra Bose Indian Botanic Garden, Shibpur, Howrah, near Kolkata, India. The great banyan tree draws more visitors to the garden than its collection of exotic plants from five continents. Its main trunk  became infected by fungi after it was struck by two cyclones, so in 1925 the main trunk  of the tree was amputated to keep the remainder healthy. A  road was built around its circumference, but the tree continues to spread beyond it.
 It was recorded to be the largest tree specimen in the world in the Guinness Book of World Records in 1989.

Botanical classification
Botanically known as Ficus benghalensis, and belonging to the family Moraceae, the tree is a native of India.  The fruit is like a small fig and is eaten by some people. It tastes sweeter than fig. The banyan plant is seen sometimes growing from the little wet dust deposits on buildings because birds carry them around for eating. The fruit is red and when ripe gets softer.

History and description

The Great Banyan tree is believed to be at least 250 years old, and has been referenced in many travel books, going back to at least the nineteenth century.  Early travel writers found it to be noteworthy due to its large size and its unusually high number of prop-trunks. It has survived three great cyclones in 1864, 1867, and 2020 when some of its main branches were broken. With its large number of aerial roots, which grow from the branches and run vertically to the ground, The Great Banyan is said to appear more like a dense forest than as an individual tree. 

The tree survives without its main trunk, which decayed and had to be removed in 1925. A monument has been erected to the dead trunk near the tree's center, but the marker is hardly accessible to visitors, who seldom venture within the tree's thick inner tangle of roots and branches.  Visitors generally prefer to access only the perimeter of the tree.  The area occupied by the tree is about  square metres (about 1.89 hectares or 4.67 acres). The present crown of the tree has a circumference of 486 m. and the highest branch rises to 24.5 m; it has at present 3772 aerial roots reaching down to the ground as a prop root. Its height is almost equivalent to the Gateway of India.

The tree lost several prop roots when Cyclone Amphan passed through West Bengal on 20 May, 2020.

See also
Sahabi Tree
 Thimmamma Marrimanu (The World's Largest Banyan Tree)
 List of Banyan trees in India
Midh Ranjha Tree
 Dodda Alada Mara
 List of individual trees

Citations

References

External links

 The Great Banyan Tree. Atlas Obscura

Tourist attractions in Howrah district
Individual banyan trees
Howrah
Trees of India
Individual trees in India